Fort Vermilion 173B is an Indian reserve of the Tallcree First Nation in Alberta, located within Mackenzie County. It is 1 kilometre southwest of Fort Vermilion. In the 2016 Canadian Census, it recorded a population of 96 living in 23 of its 25 total private dwellings.

References

Mackenzie County
Indian reserves in Alberta